Aleksandar Šapić (born 1 June 1978) is a Serbian politician, and former professional water polo player serving as mayor of Belgrade since 20 June 2022. A member and current vice-president of the Serbian Progressive Party (SNS), Šapić had previously served as president of the New Belgrade municipality from 2012 to 2022.

Šapić was previously a member of the Democratic Party (DS) until 2014, and he later led the Serbian Patriotic Alliance until the merger into SNS which occurred in May 2021. During his professional water polo career, he played for two Olympic bronze medal squads, one for FR Yugoslavia at the 2000 Olympics in Sydney, the other for Serbia at the 2008 Olympics in Beijing, and one Olympic silver medal squad for Serbia and Montenegro at the 2004 Olympics in Athens.

Education
He graduated from the Megatrend University Faculty for Management in 2003, received his master's degree in 2009 and tried to defend his Ph.D. dissertation in 2012, in the field of industrial management. His doctoral thesis has gained public attention in 2014, when a number of experts claimed that it contained plagiarized parts.

Water polo career

Club career
He started playing water polo in 1984, in WC Crvena Zvezda where he played for all young categories teams. He transferred to WC Partizan in 1991, not yet fourteen he made his senior debut in 1992. He returned to WC Crvena Zvezda in 1993 and he continued his career in WC Bečej starting 1994. In 2001, he moved to Italy, WC Camogli, where he spent three seasons, and after that, he transferred to WC Rari Nantes Savona. He left Italy in 2006 when he went to Russian water polo club Shturm 2002 where he signed a contract that made him the best-paid player in water polo history.

During his brilliant club career, he won 21 trophies of which 9 National Championship (6 he won in SRY, 2 in Russia and 1 in Italy). He also won National Cups 9 times (7 National Cups of SRY and 2 National Cups of Russia). He once won LEN Euroleague and twice LEN CUP.

In the period 1996–2009 he was the leagues' top scorer fourteen times in a row, 6 times in SRY, 5 times in Italy, and 3 times in Russia.
During his club career he scored 1.694 goals, most of the number 924 he scored for clubs in SRY, in Italian league he scored 494 times and in Russia 276 times.

He finished his professional water polo career in 2009.

Club titles (21)
 9 National Championships – 6 SRY, 2 Russia, 1 Italy      
 9 National Cups- 7 SRY, 2 Russia                         
 2 LEN Cups                                                                     
 1 LEN Euroleague

14 consecutive top-scorer titles 1996–2009
National Championship of Yugoslavia Top Scorer (6): 1995–96, 1996–97, 1997–98, 1998–99, 1999–2000, 2000–01
Serie A1 Top Scorer (5): 2001–02, 2002–03, 2003–04, 2004–05, 2005–06
Russian Championship Top Scorer (3): 2006–07, 2007–08, 2008–09
LEN Champions League Top Scorer (2): 1999–2000, 2002–03
Olympic Games Top Scorer (3): 2000 Sydney:2004 Athens : 2008 Beijing
Best Sportsman by OCS (1): 2004
World Championship MVP (1): 2005 Montreal
World Championship  Top Scorer (2):2003 Barcelona : 2005 Montreal
European Championship Top Scorer (3): 2003 Kranj, 2006 Belgrade, 2008 Málaga
World Cup Top Scorer (1): 2006 Budapest
Serbia's sport association "May Award" : 2008

Number of scored goals
 SRY (Crvena zvezda, Becej) – 924
 Italy (Camogli, Rari Nantes Savona) – 494
 Russia (Shturm 2002) – 276

National team career
Šapić made his debut for the national team of Yugoslavia in December 1995 when he was only seventeen, and played for them until 2008. At the very start of his national team career, Yugoslavia won two European U19 championships – 1995 in Esslingen and 1996 in Istanbul – and Šapić was the best player and top scorer in both.

He took part in his first major competition at the age of eighteen, the 1996 Summer Olympics in Atlanta. He would play for the national team in the Olympic Games four times and he went on to win three Olympic medals, bronze when representing Yugoslavia at the 2000 Olympics in Sydney, silver for Serbia and Montenegro at the 2004 Olympics in Athens, and another bronze medal when playing for Serbia at the 2008 Olympics in Beijing.
 
With the national team of Yugoslavia, later Serbia and Montenegro, and finally Serbia, he played in 22 sports tournaments overall, winning a total of 20 medals, five of which were from the European Championships, four from the World Championships and three from the Olympic Games. He won two medals in the World Cup, five in World League tournaments, and he won a gold medal in the 1997 Mediterranean Games in Bari.

Šapić scored 981 goals in 385 games that he played for the national team. He was twice top scorer in the Olympic Games. Šapić ranks third on the all-time scoring list in Olympic history, with 64 goals. He was four times top scorer of both the World Championship and the European Championship. He was also four times the top scorer of the World League tournaments and he won the title of top scorer twice in the World Cup.

During his national team career, the team was named "ideal team" eight times in the tournaments that he played in, three times in both the World and European Championships, and twice in the Olympic Games.

World Championship
 1998 – bronze medal – top scorer – ideal team            
 2001 – silver medal – top scorer – ideal team
 2003 – bronze medal – top scorer
 2005 – gold medal – MVP and top scorer – ideal team 
 2007 – 4th place

European Championship
 1997 – silver medal                                                                                 
 2001 – gold medal – top scorer – ideal team	         
 2003 – gold medal – MVP – ideal team 
 2006 – gold medal – top scorer – ideal team	
 2008 – silver medal – top scorer

Olympic Games
 1996 – 8th place
 2000 – bronze medal – top scorer – ideal team
 2004 – silver medal – top scorer – ideal team
 2008 – bronze medal

World League
 2004 – silver medal – top scorer
 2005 – gold medal – top scorer
 2006 – gold medal 
 2007 – gold medal – top scorer
 2008 – gold medal – top scorer

World Cup
 2002 – bronze medal – top scorer
 2006 –  gold medal – top scorer

Mediterranean Games
 1997 – gold medal

Number of scored goals
 National team (SRY, SMne, Serbia) – 981
 Number of goals scored in career – 2675

Top scorer
 2 times top scorer Olympic Games 
 4 times top scorer European Championship
 4 times top scorer World League
 2 times top scorer World Cup

Ideal team
 8 times chosen in ideal team (OG, WC, EC)

Post-retirement career

Besides his full of trophies water polo career, he gave his contribution to Serbian sport through engagement in sports organizations. He was the president of the water polo club Crvena zvezda from 2003 to 2004.

After finishing his career as a player in Italian club Rari Nantes Savona for the club he continued working as a sports manager for European competitions in the period 2006–2014.

Political career 
He was the assistant of the Mayor from 2009 to 2012. He was elected the president of New Belgrade municipality in 2012 and he was reelected in 2016. He is still the president of the biggest municipality in Belgrade. He ran in the Belgrade Assembly elections in 2018, as a mayoral candidate. Šapić stated that he is not interested in pre-election coalitions, and that he will compete alone, as an independent candidate.
His list took third place with 9,09% (12 seats in the assembly).

Charity work 
He is the founder of a humanitarian foundation –Be Humane that is founded in 2014, and it started working in June, 2014. Be Humane raises funds in order to help children, adults, institutions and organizations from Serbia. Be Humane in a very short time became one of the most relevant and most trusted humanitarian foundations in the region and its aim is to help to cure and ensuring needed therapy for children at the first place.

Since it was founded until today, with the help of Be Humane more than 1 million euros was raised. Thanks to that great number of users' help were supplied with therapy and send to proper medical treatment. In February 2016 Aleksandar Šapić donated all the medals he won in his water polo career and they are being sold in auction, money raised in this humane action will be donated for curing and therapies of Be Humane users.

He received numerous awards for community service and humanitarian work. With those awards, many institutions in Serbia showed respect and gratitude to him for everything he did in the field of humanitarian work as an active sportsman and he continued doing, even in a more intense and responsible way, after he is retired from water polo.

Personal life 
Šapić is married and a father of two sons. He lives and works in Belgrade. He speaks Serbian, Russian, Italian, and English.

Šapić has appeard in the 2004 Serbian film When I Grow Up, I'll Be a Kangaroo, portraying the role of a local neighborhood heavy named Gangula. He took part in the humanitarian TV program Ples sa zvezdama, a Serbian version of Dancing with the Stars.

See also
 Serbia men's Olympic water polo team records and statistics
 Serbia and Montenegro men's Olympic water polo team records and statistics
 List of Olympic medalists in water polo (men)
 List of players who have appeared in multiple men's Olympic water polo tournaments
 List of men's Olympic water polo tournament top goalscorers
 List of world champions in men's water polo
 List of World Aquatics Championships medalists in water polo

References

 
 VATERPOLO: Šapić "osušio" kapicu, MTS Mondo, 12 May 2009.

External links

 
 
 
 

1978 births
Living people
Serbian people of Montenegrin descent
Sportspeople from Belgrade
Yugoslav male water polo players
Serbia and Montenegro male water polo players
Serbian male water polo players
Water polo drivers
Water polo players at the 1996 Summer Olympics
Water polo players at the 2000 Summer Olympics
Water polo players at the 2004 Summer Olympics
Water polo players at the 2008 Summer Olympics
Medalists at the 2000 Summer Olympics
Medalists at the 2004 Summer Olympics
Medalists at the 2008 Summer Olympics
Olympic water polo players of Yugoslavia
Olympic water polo players of Serbia and Montenegro
Olympic bronze medalists for Federal Republic of Yugoslavia
Olympic silver medalists for Serbia and Montenegro
Olympic bronze medalists for Serbia in water polo
World Aquatics Championships medalists in water polo
European champions for Serbia and Montenegro
European champions for Serbia
Competitors at the 1997 Mediterranean Games
Mediterranean Games medalists in water polo
Mediterranean Games gold medalists for Yugoslavia
Members of the National Assembly (Serbia)
Mayors of Belgrade
Democratic Party (Serbia) politicians
Serbian Patriotic Alliance politicians
Serbian Progressive Party politicians